The 1978 Special Honours in New Zealand were two Special Honours Lists: in the first, dated 11 February 1978, two judges received knighthoods; and in the second, dated 20 April 1978, six people were awarded the Polar Medal, for good services as members of New Zealand expeditions to Antarctica in recent years.

Order of the British Empire

Knight Grand Cross (GBE)
Civil division
 The Honourable Ronald Keith Davison  – of Auckland; Chief Justice of New Zealand.
 The Right Honourable Sir Herbert Richard Churton Wild  – of Wellington; lately Chief Justice of New Zealand.

Polar Medal
 Major James Richard Milton Barker   – of Christchurch; officer-in-charge, 1970–1972.
 Peter John Barrett — of Wellington; geologist, 1974–1975.
 Anthony Maurice Bromley — of Christchurch; meteorological observer and station leader, 1973–1974.
 Jack Edward Hoffman — of Lower Hutt; driller, 1975–1976.
 Malcolm Gordon Laird — of Christchurch; geologist and field leader, 1974–1975.
 Alexander Thomas Wilson — of Hamilton; geochemist, 1974–1975.

References

Special honours
1978 awards